Vladimír Mihálik (born 29 January 1987 in Prešov, Czechoslovakia) is a Slovak professional ice hockey defenceman who currently playing for HK Dukla Michalovce of the Slovak Extraliga.

Playing career
Mihálik was drafted in the first round, 30th overall, in the 2005 NHL Entry Draft by the Tampa Bay Lightning.  He was the last Slovakian taken in the first round until Marko Dano eight years later. The 6'8", 246 lb Mihálik came to North America to play junior hockey in 2005, with the Red Deer Rebels of the Western Hockey League. For the 2006–07 season, he moved to the Prince George Cougars producing 26 points in 51 games before signing a three-year entry level contract with the Lightning on 6 April 2007.

He started his pro career in the 2007–08 season with the Norfolk Admirals of the American Hockey League posting 16 points as a rookie. Mihálik was promoted to the Tampa Bay Lightning for the start of the 2008–09.

He was signed by Lev Poprad on 14 July 2011. After only scoring 4 points in 34 games, he signed with Timrå IK of the Swedish Elitserien (SEL) on 28 January 2012.

Career statistics

Regular season and playoffs

International

References

External links

1987 births
Living people
HC '05 Banská Bystrica players
HC Lev Poprad players
National Hockey League first-round draft picks
Norfolk Admirals players
HC Slovan Bratislava players
Sportspeople from Prešov
Prince George Cougars players
Red Deer Rebels players
Slovak ice hockey defencemen
Timrå IK players
Tampa Bay Lightning draft picks
Tampa Bay Lightning players
HK Dukla Michalovce players
Slovak expatriate ice hockey players in the United States
Slovak expatriate ice hockey players in Canada
Slovak expatriate ice hockey players in Sweden